1986 Punjab Bus massacre may refer to 

1986 Muktsar Bus massacre of 14 Hindu and one Sikh bus-passenger by pro-Khalistan Sikh anti-Government militants.
1986 Hoshiarpur Bus massacre of 24 Hindu bus-passengers by pro-Khalistan Sikh anti-Government militants.